No One Would Listen: A True Financial Thriller is a book by whistleblower Harry Markopolos about his investigation into the Madoff investment scandal and how the U.S. Securities and Exchange Commission failed to react to his warnings. The book was released on March 2, 2010, by John Wiley & Sons.

Markopolos was a guest on The Daily Show with Jon Stewart on March 8, 2010.

Reception

The New York Journal of Books felt that the book provided "a really insightful look into the world of high finance, and the best explanation of the Madoff fraud", but found that it had "too much ... about Markopolos himself, his family, his friends". Publishers Weekly called it "an astonishing true-life whodunit", with the repercussions of Madoff's downfall serving as "a satisfying conclusion";<ref name=PW>"No One Would Listen: A True Financial Thriller", reviewed at Publishers Weekly; published February 22, 2010; retrieved July 31, 2017</ref> LexisNexis, however, faulted Markopolos for being overly critical of the SEC, and at the Wall Street Journal'', Richard Tofel (while conceding the quality of Markopolos's investigative work) stated that—by describing his own fears of retribution from organized crime—Markopolos "sheds more light than he intends on just why no one would listen".

References

External links
 No One Would Listen at Google Books.
 Official website
 No One Would Listen at Wiley.com
After Words interview with Markopolos on No One Would Listen, April 17, 2010

2010 non-fiction books
American non-fiction books
Books about traders
Finance books
Madoff investment scandal
American memoirs
Non-fiction crime books
Wiley (publisher) books